Sond may refer to:

Sensor (aka detector or probe)
SOND, abbreviation for Strengthening Our Nation's Democracy, movement motivated by the 1984 book, Strong Democracy
Tarunpreet Singh Sond (fl. 2020s), Indian politician
Praveen Sond, actress in "Nest of Angels", a 2003 episode of the TV series Spooks
Sond., taxonomic author abbreviation of Otto Wilhelm Sonder (1812–1881), German botanist